The Volcán de Colima, 3,820 m (12,533 ft), also known as Volcán de Fuego, is part of the Colima Volcanic Complex (CVC) consisting of Volcán de Colima, Nevado de Colima and the eroded El Cántaro (listed as extinct). It is the youngest of the three and as of 2015 is one of the most active volcanoes in Mexico and in North America. It has erupted more than 40 times since 1576. One of the largest eruptions was on January 20–24, 1913. It is the 26th-most prominent peak in North America.

Despite its name, only a fraction of the volcano's surface area is in the state of Colima; the majority of its surface area lies over the border in the neighboring state of Jalisco, toward the western end of the Trans-Mexican Volcanic Belt.

Since 1869–1878, a parasitic set of domes, collectively known as El Volcancito, has formed on the northeast flank of the main cone of the volcano.

Geological history
In the late Pleistocene era, a huge landslide occurred at the mountain, with approximately 25 km³ (6 cubic miles) of debris traveling some 120 km, reaching the Pacific Ocean. An area of some 2,200 km² was covered in landslide deposits. The currently active cone is within a large caldera that was probably formed by a combination of landslides and large eruptions. The lava is andesite containing 56-61% SiO2. About 300,000 people live within 40 km (25 miles) of the volcano, which makes it the most dangerous volcano in Mexico. In light of its history of large eruptions and situation in a densely populated area, it was designated a Decade Volcano, singling it out for study.

Current activity
In recent years there have been frequent temporary evacuations of nearby villagers due to threatening volcanic activity. Eruptions have occurred in 1991, 1998–1999 and from 2001 to the present day, with activity being characterized by extrusion of viscous lava forming a lava dome, and occasional larger explosions, forming pyroclastic flows and dusting the areas surrounding the volcano with ash and tephra.

The largest eruption for several years occurred on May 24, 2005. Pyroclastic flows travelled 4–5 km from the vent, and lava bombs landed 3–4 km away. Authorities set up an exclusion zone within 6.5 km of the summit.

On November 21, 2014, the volcano erupted again. An ash column was sent 5 km into the air, covering towns as far as 25 km away in ash. No fatalities were reported, and no evacuations took place. There were eruptions on January 10, 21 and 25, with the ash from the January 21 eruption falling in towns more than 15 miles (24 km) away. 
On 10 July 2015, there was another eruption. Another eruption occurred on Sunday, September 25, 2016, sending a plume of ash and smoke 10,000 feet (3048 m) into the sky. During December 2016, ash plumes occurred once or twice a day. On Sunday, December 18, 2016, there were three eruptions. The biggest columns of ash reached 2 kilometers in height.
Colima volcano experienced another strong explosion at 06:27 UTC (00:27 CST) on January 18, 2017. The eruption spewed volcanic ash up to 4 km (13,123 feet) above the crater.

Volcanological center 
The volcano is monitored by the Colima Volcano Observatory at the University of Colima, Mexico. A team analyzes, interprets and communicates every event that occurs at this volcano.

In 2018, a webcam was installed close to the volcano, and volcanic activity can be seen in real-time.

References
Notes

Bibliography
 Domínguez T., Ramírez J.J., Breton M. (2003), Present Stage Of Activity At Colima Volcano, Mexico, American Geophysical Union, Fall Meeting 2003, abstract #V42B-0350

External links

 Universidad de Colima, Observatorio Vulcanológico (in Spanish) 
 Universidad de Colima, Centro de Intercambio e Investigación en Vulcanología (in English and Spanish)
 Experiments at Colima by the Alaska Volcano Observatory
 
 

Colima
Colima
Landforms of Jalisco
Colima
Colima
Colima
Colima
Colima
Colima
Colima
Colima
Mountains of Mexico
North American 4000 m summits
Holocene stratovolcanoes